Mozambique competed in the 2014 Commonwealth Games in Glasgow, Scotland from July 23 to August 3, 2014.

Medalists

Athletics

Men
Track & road events

Women
Track & road events

Boxing

Men

Women

Judo

Men

Swimming

Men

Women

References

Nations at the 2014 Commonwealth Games
Mozambique at the Commonwealth Games
Com